The John Locke Lectures are a series of annual lectures in philosophy given at the University of Oxford. Named for British philosopher John Locke, the Locke Lectures are the world's most prestigious lectures in philosophy, and are among the world's most prestigious academic lectures. They were established in 1950 by the bequest of Henry Wilde. Another comparable lecture series is the Gifford Lectures, which are delivered annually at several universities in Scotland.

The first lecture series was offered to Ludwig Wittgenstein, who eventually declined. He felt uncomfortable giving formal lectures where the audience would not be asking or answering questions.

Lecturers
The lectures began as an uncertain biannual series, with the first lecturer from 1950 to 1951, and missing the second slot from 1952 to 1953.  Between 1969 and 2001, the lectures became gradually more frequent. Since 2001, the lecture notes have been made available electronically.

Notes

External links
 John Locke Lectures, complete list with some available online
 Archived list up to 2008

Locke
Philosophy events
John Locke